Fasciotomy or fasciectomy is a surgical procedure where the fascia is cut to relieve tension or pressure in order to treat the resulting loss of circulation to an area of tissue or muscle. Fasciotomy is a limb-saving procedure when used to treat acute compartment syndrome. It is also sometimes used to treat chronic compartment stress syndrome. The procedure has a very high rate of success, with the most common problem being accidental damage to a nearby nerve.

Indications
Compartment syndrome is one of the conditions where a fasciotomy may be indicated. People who are likely to have injuries needing a fasciotomy include the following:
 Crush injuries
 Athletes who have sustained one or more serious impact injuries
 People with severe burns
 People who are severely overweight
 Snakebite victims, but very rarely

Complications
A delay in performing the procedure can lead to neurovascular complications or lead to the need for amputation of a limb. Complications can also involve the formation of scar tissue after the operation. A thickening of the surgical scars can result in the loss of mobility of the joint involved. This can be addressed through occupational or physical therapy.

Process

Fasciotomy in the limbs is usually performed by a surgeon under general or regional anesthesia. An incision is made in the skin, and a small area of fascia is removed where it will best relieve pressure.

Plantar fasciotomy is an endoscopic procedure. The physician makes two small incisions on either side of the heel. An endoscope is inserted in one incision to guide the physician. A tiny knife is inserted in the other. A portion of the fascia near the heel is removed. The incisions are then closed.

In addition to scar formation, there is a possibility that the surgeon may need to use a skin graft to close the wound. Sometimes when closing the fascia again in another surgical procedure, the muscle is still too large to close it completely. A small bulge is visible, but is not harmful. It takes a much longer time to heal and in some cases takes several months.

See also 
 List of surgeries by type
 Ischemia-repurfusion injuries of the appendicular musculoskeletal system

References

Surgical procedures and techniques